Mackenzie is a locality in the Central Highlands Region, Queensland, Australia.

Geography 
The Mackenzie River forms the eastern, northern and north-western boundary of the locality. The land in the north of the locality is lower-lying (elevations of ) rising to higher levels (elevations of ) in the south. Moultrie State Forest is in the south of the locality.

The land use is a mix of cropping and grazing.

History 
The locality's  name presumably derives from the Mackenzie River, which in turn was named by explorer Ludwig Leichhardt on 10 January 1845, after his friend pastoralist Evan Mackenzie of Kilcoy Station.

References 

Central Highlands Region
Localities in Queensland